Carlos Wilfredo Alarcón Ferrada (Curacautín, Chile, September 18, 1932 - Temuco, Chile, July 2, 2010) was a Chilean Catholic priest. He was imprisoned, tortured, and survived an attempted execution by agents of Augusto Pinochet's dictatorship.

Life
Father Wilfredo served as a priest of Perquenco, a town and commune in southern Chile's Araucanía Region. When he was arrested on September 13, 1973, by Carabineros de Chile from the city of Lautaro, he was accused of "slandering and defacing" the Armed Forces and illegally taking land and acting as a militant of the MIR. He was detained for one week in the Lautaro prison, where he was subjected to multiple interrogations.

On the night of September 17 of the same year, his feet and hands were wrapped with barbed wire. He was transferred by a truck to the air base "Maquehue" of Temuco. He was a victim of poisoning and brutal beatings there. Later he was taken to the banks of the Cautín River where he was tortured and shot. Ferrada was thrown in the river, but survived.

He was secularized, had two children and died in July 2010.

References

1932 births
20th-century Chilean Roman Catholic priests
2010 deaths
Chilean human rights activists
Chilean torture victims